The Captain Cook Highway is a short, regional highway in Queensland which originates in Cairns and terminates in Mossman, where it joins Mossman-Daintree Road, continuing to Daintree.

The Captain Cook Highway is used to connect the CBD of Cairns to the Northern Beaches; a collection of suburbs which comprise the northern section of Cairns. It is also used by many tourists travelling to  the town of Port Douglas, north of Cairns. Apart from being a vital link between two tourist locations, the Captain Cook Highway is a scenic highway that winds alongside the coast of the tropical seaside rainforest heading towards Port Douglas and Daintree National Park.

Route description
The Captain Cook Highway commences at the northern end of the Bruce Highway (Mulgrave Road), in the Cairns CBD. It runs through the CBD and the suburbs of Cairns North and Aeroglen as Sheridan Street, with a speed limit of 60km/h. In this section, it intersects with Airport Drive, providing a connection to Cairns Airport. After the intersection with Aeroglen Drive, the northerly and southerly directions of the highway become separated by a median and the speed limit increases to 80km/h. It runs as National Route 1 north past the suburbs of Machans Beach, Holloways Beach, and Yorkeys Knob, until it reaches the intersection of the Cairns Western Arterial Road towards the Redlynch Valley. 

As of November 25th, 2021, the highway branches off from this intersection onto the Smithfield Bypass; a two-lane section of highway which follows a path to the east of the Smithfield business center. This was constructed at a cost of $164 million.

The original route continues north to the intersection of the Kennedy Highway in Smithfield, next to the Smithfield Shopping Centre. From this intersection, the highway continues north to the intersection of McGregor road, next to James Cook University, where it joins with the Smithfield Bypass. The two routes recombine and continue north as State Route 44 past the suburbs of Trinity Park, Trinity Beach, Kewarra Beach, Clifton Beach, Palm Cove, and Ellis Beach. It then continues along the coast through Wangetti and Craiglie, before turning north-west to its terminus in Mossman.

Upgrades

Upgrade planning
A project to analyse options for upgrading a section of road from Poolwood Road roundabout to Endeavour Road, at a cost of $620,000, was to be completed by mid-2021.

Upgrade construction
A project to upgrade the road between Cairns and Smithfield, at a cost of $359 million, was expected to commence construction in June 2022.

Major intersections

Gallery

See also

 Highways in Australia
 List of highways in Queensland

References

External links

Cairns, Queensland
Highways in Queensland
Far North Queensland
Highway 1 (Australia)